Bezzina is a genus of tephritid  or fruit flies in the family Tephritidae.

Species
Bezzina margaritifera (Bezzi, 1908)
Bezzina nigrapex (Munro, 1937)

References

Tephritinae
Tephritidae genera
Diptera of Africa